The 2013–14 season was PFC CSKA Sofia's 66th consecutive season in A Group. This article shows player statistics and all matches (official and friendly) that the club will play during the 2013–14 season.

Players

Squad stats 
Appearances for competitive matches only

  

|-
|colspan="14"|Players sold or loaned out after the start of the season:

|}
As of 17 May 2014

Top scorers

As of 17 May 2014

Disciplinary record

As of 17 May 2014

Players in/out

Summer transfers 

In:

Out:

Winter transfers 

In:

Out:

Pre-season and friendlies

Competitions

A Group

First phase

Table

Results summary

Results by round

Fixtures and results

Championship group

Table

Results summary

Results by round

Fixtures and results

Bulgarian Cup 

CSKA won 7–3 on aggregate and qualified for the Second Round.

0–0 on aggregate. Levski won 7–6 on penalties. CSKA is eliminated.

See also 
PFC CSKA Sofia

References

External links 
CSKA Official Site
CSKA Fan Page with up-to-date information
Bulgarian A Professional Football Group
UEFA Profile

PFC CSKA Sofia seasons
Cska Sofia